White Irish Drinkers is a 2010 American drama film written and directed by John Gray and starring Nick Thurston and Geoffrey Wigdor.

Premise
Brooklyn, 1975: brothers Brian and Danny Leary are looking for a way out of their working-class neighborhood, so they make a pact to rob a local theater on the night of a Rolling Stones concert.

Cast
 Nick Thurston as Brian Leary
 Regan Mizrahi as Young Brian Leary
 Geoffrey Wigdor as Danny Leary
 Anthony Amorim as Young Danny Leary
 Stephen Lang as Patrick Leary
 Karen Allen as Margaret Leary
 Peter Riegert as Whitey
 Zachary Booth as Todd McKay
 Leslie Murphy as Shauna  
 Robbie Sublett as Ray (as Robbie Collier Sublett)  
 Michael Drayer as Dennis  
 Henry Zebrowski as Jerry  
 Ken Jennings as Jimmy Cheeks  
 Jackie Martling as Cop  
 Jimmy Palumbo as Jimmy  
 Lana Del Rey as Diane

Release and reception
White Irish Drinkers film premiered at the 2010 Toronto International Film Festival and was later picked up for distribution by Screen Media Films. The film was theatrically released on March 26, 2011.

Since premiering at Toronto, the film has won awards at the Manhattan, Chicago United, and Woodstock Film Festivals.  The film was also a finalist for the Gotham Festival Genius Award.

References

External links
 
 
 
 
 

2010 films
2010 independent films
2010 crime drama films
2010s heist films
American crime drama films
American heist films
Cultural depictions of the Rolling Stones
Films about brothers
Films about dysfunctional families
Films about Irish-American culture
Films scored by Mark Snow
Films directed by John Gray (director)
Films set in 1975
Films set in Brooklyn
Films shot in New York City
American independent films
2010s English-language films
2010s American films